The Lok Janshakti Party ( LJP,  "People’s Manpower Party") was a state political party mainly based in the state of Bihar, India. The party was formed in 2000 when Ram Vilas Paswan split from Janata Dal. The party had a considerable following amongst Dalits in Bihar. The Party is factioned into two parties Lok Janshakti Party (Ram Vilas) and Rashtriya Lok Janshakti Party.

History

In 2000, late Ram Vilas Paswan formed the Lok Janshakti Party as its president. Along with Paswan his brother, Ram Chandra Paswan, Capt. Jai Narain Prasad Nishad and Ramesh Jigajinagi also joined the party.

LJP contested the polls in alliance with the Indian National Congress and the Rashtriya Janata Dal and won four Lok Sabha seats. Ram Vilas Paswan remained a Union Minister in Ministry of Chemicals and Fertilizers and Ministry of Steel.

In the 2005 Bihar assembly polls held in February the party contested in alliance with the Congress and against the RJD and won 29 assembly seats. However no alliance could secure majority and party refused to give support to any alliance to form the Government. There were rumours that certain party MLAs were ready to defect to JD(U) allowing the formation of an NDA Government. In a controversial episode, President's rule was imposed in the State and after a few months Bihar's state assembly was dissolved. Elections were again held in October month in which NDA came to power with a thumping majority with Nitish Kumar as the Chief Minister. Party had fielded its candidates in 203 seats of which party could win only 10 seats.

The party contested the 2009 Lok Sabha General elections in an alliance called fourth front which constituted the Rashtriya Janata Dal, Lok Janshakti Party and the Samajwadi Party. This move proved to be disastrous, since LJP couldn't win a single seat, and RJD were reduced to 4 seats in the Lok Sabha. After the election Laloo Prasad Yadav, admitted that it was a mistake to leave the UPA, and gave unconditional support to Manmohan Singh and the newly formed UPA government.

Jan Morcha the party founded by former Prime Minister Vishwanath Pratap Singh was merged with the LJP in March 2009. Jan Morcha president Ajeya Pratap Singh, son of Vishwanath Pratap Singh, was immediately appointed a senior LJP functionary.

On the more disastrous side LJP suffered a major jolt when, its entire Jharkhand Unit merged with the Congress before the 2009 elections citing that Paswan had ignored them. Paswan then announced the dissolution of party's Jharkhand Unit.

In 2010 Bihar Legislative Assembly election, the party had contested in an alliance with Rashtriya Janata Dal. However party could secure only 6.75% votes winning only 3 seats which was 7 less than the previous elections in 2006.

In August 2011, there were claims made by the Speaker of the Bihar Legislative Assembly that the party had merged with JD(U) as 2 of the 3 MLAs of the party had joined JD(U). However the party had denied any such move.

On 27 February 2014, Lok Janshakti Party officially announced it re-entering the National Democratic Alliance led by Bharatiya Janata Party, after a gap of 12 years. It contested 7 Lok Sabha seats from Bihar in 2014 Indian general election.

LJP won 6 of the 7 seats it contested including Ram Vilas Paswan and his son Chirag Paswan. Ram Vilas Paswan resigned from his Rajya Sabha seat. He was also made Minister for Food and Civil Supplies in the NDA government that came to power on 26 May 2014.

In 2015 Bihar Legislative Assembly election, the party contested in an alliance with BJP-led National Democratic Alliance. It contested 40 seats out of 243 in the assembly. It won only two seats, one less than the last election in 2010.

In 2017, Pashupati Paras brother of Ram Vilas was inducted into Nitish Kumar cabinet as Minister of Animal & Fish Resources after Janata Dal (United) joined BJP-led National Democratic Alliance.

2020 Bihar Assembly Elections
After the entry of Lok Janshakti Party in National Democratic Alliance in 2014, the NDA's principal parties in Bihar namely LJP, Bharatiya Janata Party and Rashtriya Lok Samta Party had contested against the JD(U) – Rashtriya Janata Dal-Indian National Congress Mahagathbandhan alliance in 2015 and further until 2020 Bihar Assembly Election. On the question of seat sharing for the 2020 Assembly elections, the LJP under the presidency of Chirag Paswan decided to quit NDA and fight on 143 Assembly seats alone. This turned out to be the single most important reason for the poor electoral performance of JD(U) led by Nitish Kumar. The Quint reported, if LJP would have formed a pre poll alliance with BJP, National Democratic Alliance would have won additional 38 seats.

The parliamentary committee of LJP however decided to support BJP in and outside the state with the number of seats they win in the state while contesting solely. The move as per party leadership was to oppose JD(U) while allying with the BJP. The way for the party was not though easy as it was to face a number of coalitions and political parties which were contesting the elections with their support bases.

LJP crisis 2021
Chirag Paswan expelled five rebel MPs. Paras-led camp removed him as party chief. Leaving the split wide open in the Lok Janshakti Party, five MPs led by Pasupati Paras on Tuesday claimed that they have removed party national president Chirag Paswan from the post. However, Paswan said that LJP called a national executive meeting and removed the five rebel MPs from the party's primary membership.

The latest development came a day after five of the party MPs rebelled against late Ram Vilas Paswan's son Chirag. The five MPs – Pashupati Kumar Paras (Hajipur), Choudhary Mehboob Ali Qaisar (Khagaria), Chandan Kumar (Nawada), Veena Devi (Vaishali) and Prince Raj (Samastipur) —met Lok Sabha Speaker Om Birla on Sunday evening and again on Monday, saying that they have elected Paras as LJP parliamentary party leader and Kaiser as deputy leader. Late Monday night, the Lok Sabha Secretariat issued a circular confirming Paras as leader of the LJP in the Lok Sabha.

In his first reaction after his uncle Pashupati Paras ousted him, Paswan likened the organization to a mother who should not be "betrayed". In a tweet, he said he made efforts to keep the party founded by his father Ram Vilas Paswan and his family together but failed.

People are supreme in a democracy, Paswan said and thanked those who have kept faith in the party.
Paswan also shared a letter he had written to Paras, the youngest brother of his father, in March in which he had highlighted his uncle's unhappiness over a number of issues, including his elevation as the party president.

The series of dramatic events came months after the Bihar Assembly elections in October–November last year, in the run-up to which Chirag Paswan had attacked the JD(U) and Chief Minister Nitish Kumar, and stepped out of the NDA, all along maintaining that he wanted to work with the BJP. The LJP had, however, fared poorly in the elections, with its lone MLA eventually crossing over to the JD(U).

After the interpretation of ECI, ECI froze the Lok Janshakti Party name & Symbol "Bungalow" and allot Lok Janshakti Party (Ram Vilas) led by Chirag Paswan and Rashtriya Lok Janshakti Party led by Cabinet Minister Pashupati Kumar Paras.

References

 
State political parties in Bihar
Political parties established in 2000
2000 establishments in Bihar
Political parties in India
Janata Parivar
Janata Dal